Sherborne Qatar consists of four English speaking schools –  Sherborne Qatar Senior School for pupils aged 11 to 18, Sherborne Qatar Prep School for pupils aged 3 to 11, Sherborne Qatar Junior School for pupils aged 4 to 11 and Sherborne Qatar School for Girls currently for pupils aged 3–16 (3-18 from 2023). 
The schools aim to provide a wide and stimulating curriculum for all of its pupils, whatever their nationality, and it is a belief that pupils' well-being and academic excellence are equally important. The schools want to meet the ‘whole’ needs of every child within a culturally diverse environment which nurtures their skills, ambitions and moral development. Pupils benefit from small class sizes and age-appropriate facilities, enabling the schools to deliver provisions which encourage the 21st Century learner and develop the future global citizen. The schools have exciting and varied enrichment programmes that include musical, sporting, artistic and academic activities, ensuring all pupils are able to extend their learning beyond the classroom.
The motto of the three schools is "Education For Life". Sherborne Qatar has been incorporated in the Ministry of Education's educational reform program, the 'Outstanding Schools Program'. The school has been ranked as a "good school with some significant strengths" in British School Overseas inspection report.

History
Sherborne was established in Qatar in 2009 at the invitation of the Supreme Education Council. A member of the ruling family, Abdullah bin Ahmed Al Thani, had recommended the school to the council. It was the first Sherborne branch established outside the United Kingdom. Colin Niven was the founding principal.

Memberships
The schools are members of the following organisations:
QUESS (Qatar Unified English Speaking Schools)
BSME (British Schools in the Middle East)
COBIS
IAPS

References

Schools in Qatar
British international schools in Qatar
Qatar–United Kingdom relations
2009 establishments in Qatar
International schools in Qatar